"Be a Nigger Too" is a single released in anticipation of Nas' ninth Untitled studio album. Because of sample clearance issues, it is not included on the album. It is produced by Salaam Remi, making it Remi's sixth single production for Nas.

Overview
A remix of the track featuring Dante Hawkins was released on a mixtape with DJ Green Lantern The Nigger Tape.

Music video
The music video, directed by Rik Cordero, was recorded in Los Angeles and New York City. It has recently been released online and features cameos from actors of differing ethnicities.

The video, which was not released for television, is based on the monologue scene from the film 25th Hour.

In the beginning of the video Nas' song "Proclamation" from Untitled can be heard.

Roles
Andre Royo and Gbenga Akinnagbe of The Wire are both seen in the video as the "nigga".
John Cho and James Kyson Lee are both seen in the video as the "chink nigga".
Danny Hoch plays a "kyke nigga".
Larry Gilliard, Jr. also has a cameo in the video.

References

2008 singles
2008 songs
Nas songs
Def Jam Recordings singles
Song recordings produced by Salaam Remi
Songs written by Nas
Songs written by Salaam Remi